Foot Ball Club Aurora is a Peruvian football club, playing in the city of Arequipa, Peru. The club were founded 1916 and play in the Copa Perú which is the third division of the Peruvian league.

History
The club have played at the highest level of Peruvian football on three occasions, from 1988 Torneo Descentralizado until 1991 Torneo Descentralizado when was relegated. In the 2010 Copa Perú, the club classified to the National Stage, but was eliminated by Alianza Porvenir-Unicachi of Puno in the Round of 16.

Rivalries
FBC Aurora has had a long-standing rivalry with FBC Melgar, Sportivo Huracán, FBC Piérola, and FBC White Star.

Honours

National
Copa Perú: 0
Runner-up (2): 1993, 1994

Regional
Región VII:
Runner-up (1): 2010

Liga Departamental de Arequipa:
Winners (5): 1987, 1988, 1993, 1994, 2010
Runner-up (1): 2012

Liga Superior de Arequipa:
Runner-up (1): 2010

Liga Distrital de Arequipa:
Winners (16): 1924, 1926, 1927, 1928, 1930, 1935, 1936, 1937, 1942, 1951, 1954, 1961, 1962, 1969, 1987, 2007, 2022
Runner-up (5): 1945, 1964, 2008, 2015, 2017

See also
List of football clubs in Peru
Peruvian football league system

References

Football clubs in Peru
Association football clubs established in 1916